Dr. Jerry Milner is an American social worker and civil servant, currently serving as the Acting Commissioner of the Administration for Children and Families, a division of the United States Department of Health and Human Services. He also currently oversees the Family and Youth Services Bureau and United States Children's Bureau.

Education 
Milner graduated from Reeltown High School in Reeltown, Alabama. He received a Bachelor's degree in political science from Auburn University, and received graduate degrees in social work from the University of Alabama.

Career 
Milner previously served as the Vice President for Child Welfare Practice at the Center for the Support of Families and state child welfare director for the Alabama Department of Human Resources. He was appointed to his role within the Trump Administration in June 2017.

Milner served in the United States Children's Bureau during the Bush Administration.

References 

Living people
Trump administration personnel
Alabama Republicans
University of Alabama alumni
Auburn University alumni
Year of birth missing (living people)